Dhīraśankarābharaṇaṃ, commonly known as Śankarābharaṇaṃ, is a rāga in Carnatic music. It is the 29th Melakarta rāga in the 72 Melakarta rāga system of Carnatic music. Since this raga has many Gamakās (ornamentations), it is glorified as "Sarva Gamaka Maaṇika Rakti Rāgaṃ".

By scale wise, the Śankarābharaṇaṃ scale corresponds to Bilaval in the Hindustani music system.  The Western equivalent is the major scale, or the Ionian mode. Hence this rāga is one of the most popular scales across the world, known with different names in different musical styles.

Its nature is mellifluous and smooth. This rāga offers a large scope for compositions. It is ideal for a melodious, but still laid back majestic presentation.

Structure and Lakshana 

It is the 5th rāga in the 5th Chakra Bāṇa. The mnemonic name is Bāṇa-Ma. The mnemonic phrase is sa ri ga ma pa da ni sa Its  structure is as follows (see swaras in Carnatic music for details on below notation and terms):
 : 
 : 

The notes in this scale are shadjam, chatushruti rishabham, antara gandharam, shuddha madhyamam, paṅchamam, chatushruti dhaivatam and Kakali Nishadam. As it is a Melakarta rāga, by definition it is a Sampurṇa rāga (has all seven notes in ascending and descending scale). It is the Shuddha Madhyamam equivalent of 65th Melakarta rāga Kaḷyāṇi.

 Janya Rāgas 

Due to the even spacing of svarās, many janya rāgas can be derived from Śaņkarābharaṇaṃ. It is one of the melakarta rāgas that has high number of Janya rāgas (derived scales) associated with it.

Many of the Janya rāgas are very popular on their own, lending themselves to elaboration, interpretation and evoking different moods. Some of them are Arabhi, Atana, Bilahari, Devagaandhaari, Jana Ranjani, Hamsadhvani, Kadanakutuhalam, Niroshta, Shuddha Sāveri, Pahādi, Purnachandrika, Janaranjani, Kedaram, Kurinji, Navroj, Sarasvati-manohari, Naagadhvani etc.

See List of Janya rāgas for full list of rāgas associated with Śaṃkarābharaṇaṃ.

 Compositions Śankarābharaṇaṃ has been decorated with compositions by almost all composers. A few of the compositions are listed here.Chalamela,a popular Adathaalavarnam by Maharaja Swathi Thirunal in TeluguNrityati Nrityati  By Swati Thirunal in SanskritEduṭa Nilacitē, Bhakti Bhikṣamīyave, Maryāda Kādurā, Svararāgasudhārasa, Sundarēśvaruṇi, Manasu Svādhīnamaina and Eṃduku Peddalavalē by Tyagaraja in Telugu.Dakṣhiṇāmūrtē, Sadāśivam Upāsmahē, Akṣhayaliṃgavibho and Śrī kamalāmbā by Muthuswami Dikshitar in SanskritPogadirēlo Ranga (6th Navaratna Malike), Kande naa kanasinali, Enagu aane by Purandara Dasa in KannadaYenu Olle Hariye By Kanaka Dasa in KannadaSarōjadala Nētri and Dēvī Mīnānētri by Syama Sastri in TeluguDevi Jagath Janani,Bhaktha Paraayana by Swathi Thirunal Maharaja in SanskritRajeevaksha Baro By Swati Thirunal in Kannada
 Alarulu Kuriyaga Āḍinadē by Annamacharya in TeluguSamakarardha Sariirini by Saint Gnanananda Teertha (Ogirala Veeraraghava Sarma) in Telugu
Rama Ninnuvina by Thyagaraja
Swara Raga Sudha by Thyagaraja

Muthuswami Dikshitar also has a list of 22 "Nottu Svara" compositions, based on Western Major Scale notes to his credit.

 Related rāgas 

This section covers the theoretical and scientific aspect of this rāga.Śaṃkarābharaṇaṃ's notes when shifted using Graha bhedam, yields 5 other major Melakarta rāgas, namely, Kalyāṇi, Hanumatodi, Natabhairavi, Kharaharapriya and Harikambhoji. Graha bhedam is the step taken in keeping the relative note frequencies same, while shifting the shadjam to the next note in the rāga. Refer table below for illustration of this concept.

Notes on above table

C as the base for Śaṃkarābharaṇaṃ is chosen for above illustration only for convenience, as Carnatic music does not enforce strict frequency/note structure. The shadjam (S) is fixed by the artist as per the vocal range or the instrument's base frequency. All the other svarams are relative to this shadjam, falling into a geometric progression-like frequency pattern.

The 7th Graha bhedam of Śaṃkarābharaṇaṃ has both madhyamams (Ma) and no panchamam (Pa) and hence will not be considered a valid melakarta (rāga having all 7 swarams and only 1 of each). This is only a classification issue with respect to melakarta scales, while this structure could be theoretically used well to create good music.

 Interesting features 

The swaras are regularly spaced in these ragas. Hence these six ragas give very good melody, scope for elaboration, experimentation and exploration of phrases. In practice, Natabhairavi is not elaborated extensively much. Harikambhoji is taken up for elaboration, but not as much as the rest of the 4 ragas, namely, Śaṃkarābharaṇaṃ, Todi, Kaḷyāṇi and Kharaharapriya''. One of these 4 rāgas is sung as the main rāga in a concert quite often.

As can be seen in the illustration, these rāgas can be played using just the white keys of a piano/ organ/ keyboard (rāga in simplified fashion).

Film Songs: Tamil

Janya 1: Ragam Pahadi/Pahari 
Ascending: S R2 G3 P D2 P D2 S’ 

Descending:N3 D2 P G3 M1 G3 R2 S N3 D2 P D2 S

Film Songs: Tamil

Janya 2: Ragam Maand 
Ascending: S G3 M1 D2 N3 S 

Descending:S N3 D2 P M1 G3 R2 S

Carnatic Compositions 
 Maand Thillana by Lalgudi Jayaraman
 Paindhaane Hanuman by Arunachala Kavi
 Ramanai Bhajithaal by Papanasam Sivan
 Aadugindraan Kannan by Suddhanandha Bharathi
 Muralidhara Gopala by Periyasamy Thooran popularised by ML Vasanthakumari
 Aarumo Aaval by Kannan Iyengar, another song popularised by MLV
 Neeraja Dhala Nayana by Sambasiva Iyer popularised by Maharajapuram Santhanam
 Vaanathin Meedhu Mayilaada by Ramalinga Adigal popularised by MS Subbulakshmi

Film Songs: Tamil

Janya 3: Ragam Begada 
Ascending: S G3 R2 G3 M1 P D2 P S 

Descending: S N3 D2 P M1 G3 R2

Carnatic Compositions 
 Naadopasana by Tyagaraja
 Thyagaraja Namasthe and Vallabha Nayakasya by Dikshitar
 Varuvar Azhaithu Vaadi, by Ramalinga Adigal
 Ganarasamudaniin Bhuvaneshwari by Papanasam Sivan
 Vaa Muruga Vaa by Spencer Venugopal
 Nandri Kooruvame by T Lakshmana Pillai
 Shankari Neeve by Subbaraya Sastri
 Kalayami Raghuramam by Swati Thirunal
 Kadaikkan vaithennai by Ramasamy Sivan
 Abimanamennadu Galgu by Patnam Subramaniya Iyer
 Elle Ilangiliye, a Thiruppavai

Film Songs: Tamil

Notes

References 

Melakarta ragas